Two Canadian naval units have been named HMCS Fraser.

Battle honours
Atlantic 1939-40

Royal Canadian Navy ship names